Following his victory in legislative elections held on 25 January 2015, the newly elected Prime Minister Alexis Tsipras appointed a new cabinet to succeed the cabinet of Antonis Samaras, his predecessor. A significant reshuffle took place on 17 July 2015.

Tsipras resigned as Prime Minister on 20 August 2015, and after opposition parties failed to form their own government, on 27 August Vassiliki Thanou-Christophilou was appointed as an interim Prime Minister, and her caretaker cabinet was sworn in on 28 August. Following the subsequent September legislative election, Tsipras was re-appointed as Prime Minister on 21 September and appointed a second cabinet that was sworn in on 23 September.

Composition of the cabinet
The cabinet is composed of 35 members, alongside 6 deputy ministers. Including the deputy ministers the cabinet comprises 6 females and 35 males. It reflects the majority coalition in Parliament. It is composed of the winning Coalition of the Radical Left (SYRIZA) with the support of the right-wing anti-austerity party, Independent Greeks (ANEL). The Ecologist Greens (OP), which had withdrawn from the election in support of SYRIZA, were given the office of Alternate Minister of Environment and Energy. Finally, some ministers do not belong to any party.

Oath of office
Most members of the cabinet were sworn in on 27 January 2015, with the exception of the new Minister of Justice Nikos Paraskevopoulos , who was sworn in a day later, and the Alternate Ministers Christodoulopoulou, Spirtzis and Fotakis who were sworn in almost two months later.

While most representatives of Syriza chose a civil oath of office, the ANEL representatives as well as Yiannis Panousis, Dimitris Mardas and Panagiotis Nikoloudis chose a religious oath before a representative of the Greek orthodox Archbishop Ieronymos II of Athens.

Cabinet list

Prime Minister

Government Ministries

The number of ministries has been reduced to ten, including four merged ministries:
 The merged Ministry of Interior and Administrative Reconstruction succeeds the ministries of 1) Interior, 2) Administrative Reform and E-Government, 3) Public Order and Citizen Protection, and 4) Macedonia and Thrace.
 The merged Ministry of Economy, Infrastructure, Marine and Tourism succeeds the ministries of 1) Development and Competitiveness, 2) Marine and Aegean, 3) Tourism, and 4) Infrastructure, Transport and Networks.
 The merged Ministry of Productive Reconstruction, Environment and Energy succeeds the ministries of 1) Environment, Energy and Climate Change, 2) Rural Development and Food, and 3) the services of the General Secretariat of the Ministry of Industry Development and Competitiveness.
 The merged Ministry of Culture, Education and Religious Affairs succeeds the ministries of 1) Culture and Sport, and 2) Education.

Alternate Ministers are directly assigned special responsibilities and powers by the prime minister, including:
 full parliamentary powers and, in conjunction with the minister, the legislative initiative 
 the right to issue individual and normative acts, and to propose individual and normative decrees

Full ministers however retain:
 the identification of ministerial policy in the cabinet
 the representation in bodies of the European Union
 the appointment of administrative agencies, public services and personnel

Deputy ministers are assigned with responsibilities and powers by the prime minister and the full minister they report to.

Ministers of State

Bold denotes full ministers attending the weekly cabinet council.  a Deputy ministers are not members of the cabinet but may attend cabinet meetings.  References:

Changes

Resignations

Yanis Varoufakis, the Minister of Finance, resigned on 6 July 2015, following the 'No' vote in the Greek bailout referendum. In a blog post on his website, Varoufakis wrote: "Soon after the announcement of the referendum results, I was made aware of a certain preference by some Eurogroup participants, and assorted ‘partners’, for my... ‘absence’ from its meetings; an idea that the prime minister judged to be potentially helpful to him in reaching an agreement. For this reason I am leaving the Ministry of Finance today." Varoufakis was succeeded as Minister of Finance by Euclid Tsakalotos. Tsakalotos in turn left his role as Alternate Minister of International Economic Affairs, leaving the position vacant.

Nikolaos Chountis, the Alternate Minister of European Affairs, resigned on 13 July 2015, three days before the debate on the first round of measures in the tenth austerity package began in the Hellenic Parliament. He also resigned from his parliamentary seat. Chountis subsequently took up the post of Member of the European Parliament for Greece, following Manolis Glezos's resignation. Chountis was replaced as Alternate Minister of European Affairs by Sia Anagnostopoulou, as part of the 17 July cabinet reshuffle.

Nadia Valavani, the Alternate Minister of Finance, resigned on 15 July 2015, the day before the vote on the first round of measures in the tenth austerity package were debated in the Hellenic Parliament. Valavani was succeeded in her role by Tryfon Alexiadis on 17 July, as part of the cabinet reshuffle.

17 July 2015 cabinet reshuffle

Following a number of cabinet members voting against the government on the first set of measures in the tenth austerity package on 16 July 2015, Alexis Tsipras reshuffled his cabinet. The reshuffle took place on 17 July, and the new ministers were swon in on 18 July. The most notable move was to remove Panagiotis Lafazanis from his ministerial role.

Cabinet members that were removed from cabinet:

Panagiotis Lafazanis, the Minister of Productive Reconstruction, Environment and Energy
Kostas Isyhos, the Alternate Minister of National Defence
Dimitris Stratoulis, the Alternate Minister of Social Security

Existing cabinet members that took on new roles:

Panos Skourletis, the Minister of Labour and Social Solidarity, became the Minister of Productive Reconstruction, Environment and Energy
Georgios Katrougalos, the Alternate Minister of Administrative Reform, became the Minister of Labour and Social Solidarity
Gabriel Sakellaridis, the Deputy Minister to the Prime Minister and Government Spokesperson, became a Parliamentary Spokesperson
Olga Gerovasili, a Parliamentary Spokesperson, became the Deputy Minister to the Prime Minister and Government Spokesperson

New cabinet members:

Christophoros Vernardakis became the Alternate Minister of Administrative Reform
Tryfon Alexiadis became the Alternate Minister of Finance
Dimitris Vitsas became the Alternate Minister of National Defence
Pavlos Haikalis became the Deputy Minister of Social Security
Pavlos Polakis became an Alternate Minister of Interior and Administrative Reconstruction
Sia Anagnostopoulou became the Alternate Minister of European Affairs
Giannis Amanatidis became an Alternate Foreign Minister

References:

Along with ministerial changes, a special committee to combat corruption was also proposed by the Prime Minister, to be headed by the Minister of State for Combatting Corruption Panagiotis Nikoloudis. The committee would consist of Tryfon Alexiadis, Pavlos Polakis, Dimitris Papagelopoulos and Terence Quick.

Newly appointed Minister of Productive Reconstruction, Environment and Energy Panos Skourletis described the reshuffle as an "adjustment by the government to a new reality".

References

Cabinets of Greece
Cabinets established in 2015
2015 in Greek politics
2015 establishments in Greece
Coalition governments
Greek government-debt crisis
Syriza
Alexis Tsipras
Independent Greeks
2015 disestablishments in Greece
Cabinets disestablished in 2015